Andy Balcon (born Andrew Balcon; 1988) is a British singer, guitarist and composer.

Early life 
Andy was born Andrew Balcon on 1988 in Leeds, England. He took guitar lessons and in highschool played in a rock band. He took some jobs to pay his journeys and performed in local scenes.

Recording career

Heymoonshaker 
Andrew Balcon met the British beatboxer Dave Crowe in New Zealand in 2007 and formed a beatbox blues band in 2008 called Heymoonshaker. Dave Crowe was born in 1988 at Ledbury. He discovered the dubstep and the beatboxer A-Plus and decided to become involved in beatboxing. In 2008 he participated to Britain's Got Talent (series 2) and joined the band The Anomalies. In 2010 he reached finals of UK Beatbox Championships. They made street-shows by jaming and played at Buskers festival in Christchurch. They published on their YouTube channel the single London Part 2 who made 20 million of views and in 2017, 50 million.

In 2012, they produced and sold their first album Beatbox Blues, inpired by Led Zeppelin and Muddy Waters. They toured in festivals around the world and Rolling Stone said that they were "“A well balanced mix of smiles, verbal sparring and an impressive performance convey deep emotions. Dazzling!”".
 
In 2015, they signed with Dify Records for the album Noir, recorded in south of France with new instruments : violons, bass.HEYMOONSHAKER !, radiofrance.fr, 11 April 2013, retrieved 18 July 2022Heymoonshaker :noir, lagrosseradio.fr, 11 November 2015, retrieved 18 July 2022NOIR – HEYMOONSHAKER, flanellemag.com, 14 December 2015, retrieved 18 July 2022

 Other projects 
Andy Balcon, influenced by Led Zeppelin, The Rolling Stones, Etta James got a solo career. He released his first blues album Andy Balcon Band on 2012. On 2019, Kiss Goodnight was a pop electronic EP and his voice was  compared to Tom Waits.Heymoonshaker: nature blues, essence beatbox, lapresse.ca, 9 February 2016, retrieved 18 July 2022 He sang again in London's streets and released on 2020 the EP Who am I? more bluesy.

On 2022, he founded with Damien Félix (Catfish and Bigger) the band Dead Chic and released the heavy rock and soul EP Bastion Session.Exclu : Dead Chic – Too Far Gone, rollingstone.fr, 25 May 2022, retrieved 18 July 2022

Discography
 Andy Balcon 
 Andy Balcon Band (2012)
 Kiss Goodnight (EP) (2019)
 Who am I? (EP) (2020)

 Heymoonshaker 
 Beatbox Blues (2012)
 Shakerism (2013) (EP)
 Noir (2015)
 Live in France (2017)

 Dead Chic
 Bastion Session (EP) (2022)

 Collaborations 
 Stand up with Tilka (2017)
 Oh, Me'' with Catfish (2020)

References

External links
 Heymoonshaker's Official website
 Dead Chic's Official website

1988 births
Living people
21st-century English composers
21st-century English singers
British male guitarists
Musicians from Leeds